Boris Becker defeated Michael Chang in the final, 7–6(7–3), 6–0, 7–6(7–5) to win the singles tennis title at the 1995 ATP Tour World Championships.

Pete Sampras was the defending champion, but was defeated in the semifinals by Chang.

Seeds

Draw

Finals

White group
Standings are determined by: 1. number of wins; 2. number of matches; 3. in two-players-ties, head-to-head records; 4. in three-players-ties, percentage of sets won, or of games won; 5. steering-committee decision.

Red group
Standings are determined by: 1. number of wins; 2. number of matches; 3. in two-players-ties, head-to-head records; 4. in three-players-ties, percentage of sets won, or of games won; 5. steering-committee decision.

See also
 ATP World Tour Finals appearances

External links
 Finals Draw
 Round robin Draw (White Group)
 Round robin Draw (Red Group)
 Scores (with tie-breaks)

Singles
Tennis tournaments in Germany
1995 in German tennis
Sports competitions in Frankfurt